Yusuf Makamba is a Tanzanian CCM politician and former military officer.

Personal life
He is married to Josephine and they have four children: January, Ali, Thuwein and Mwamvita. He supports the Tanzanian Premier League club Simba S.C. countrywide and his hometown Coastal Union.

References

External links
 

Living people
Tanzanian Muslims
Chama Cha Mapinduzi politicians
Nominated Tanzanian MPs
Tanzania Military Academy alumni
Year of birth missing (living people)